The Katholische Universität Eichstätt-Ingolstadt (KU) is a Roman Catholic research university in Eichstätt and Ingolstadt, Bavaria, Germany.

Compared to other German universities it is a rather small institution with 4,800 students in 2019; nevertheless, it is the largest non-state university in Germany. The university has its main campus in Eichstätt (the buildings being in the town center or within walking distance) and another (the Ingolstadt School of Management) in Ingolstadt, site of the first Bavarian university in 1472.

History

The university's history dates back to a seminary for priests ("Collegium Willibaldum"), which was founded in 1564 by bishop Martin von Schaumburg and the old University of Ingolstadt, the first university in Bavaria, which was founded in 1472 with the approval of the pope. The latter institution was moved to the capital Munich – nowadays the Ludwig-Maximilians-Universität München (LMU) by King Ludwig I in 1826. One of the most famous rectors of the old University of Ingolstadt was the Jesuit Petrus Canisius.

Today's university came into existence in 1980, after a fusion of Eichstätt's School of Education and the School of Philosophy and Theology in 1972. A major role in the formation of the university was played by the former archbishop of Munich-Freising, Joseph Ratzinger, who later got an honorary doctorate from the university. Among others receiving honorary doctorates from the university are the philosopher Karl Popper, and the former bishop of Eichstätt Alois Brems. In 1990, the Catholic University established the WFI – Ingolstadt School of Management, one of Germany's foremost business schools. Since 1998 the Collegium Orientale, an academic institution associated with the university, hosts young theologians and priests from eastern European and Oriental churches who are pursuing their post-graduate studies in Eichstätt.

Catholic context
The university is largely funded by the state but is run by a self-governing public church trust (Stiftung Katholische Universität Eichstätt, Kirchliche Stiftung des Öffentlichen Rechts) set up by Bavarian Catholic bishops on the basis of a concordat between the Holy See and the Free State of Bavaria. The ethos of Catholic universities was defined in Pope John Paul II's Apostolic Constitution of Catholic Churches.

The CU at a glance

The 8 faculties of the Catholic University of Eichstätt-Ingolstadt offer 40 different subjects. The CU is fully accredited by the Free State of Bavaria, and is thus equated to German state universities in all respects. For students, personal faith does not play any part in the admission process. The university library has a stock of books exceeding 1.5 million volumes, thus offering students and teaching staff immediate access to books of all areas via an electronic inventory accessible from almost anywhere.

The CU has a teacher-student ratio of 1:15. In a Germany-wide ranking by Der Spiegel in 1999 the CU was amongst Germany's top universities. In subsequent years the CU received high rankings for the learning environment it offers to its students. Especially, the Faculty of Business in Ingolstadt was and continues to be one of the most competitive business schools in Germany. In 2005, the CU's journalism program was ranked among the five best media and communication programs in Germany.

The portion of international students from Europe and all over the world is very high compared to state universities. Russian, Spanish, French and English are thus very common languages in Eichstätt, many students being fluent in at least 2 of them.

One of the biggest changes currently affecting the CU is the shift from the old German academic system to the new European bachelor's and master's degrees based on credit points by 2010. This change should help to allow students to spend time abroad easily, and transfer their grades easily for their degrees at the CU.

In addition, more and more BA and MA integrated degrees are being offered, where the students spend only part of their time at the CU, the rest at one of the partner universities. These double or triple degrees offer a possibility to experience the academic environment of more than one country, and are an increasingly popular choice for freshmen at the CU.

The university has the following faculties:
 Faculty of Catholic Theology
 Faculty of Philosophy and Education
 Faculty of Languages and Literatures
 Faculty of History and Social Sciences
 Faculty of Mathematics and Geography
 Faculty of Business Administration and Economics (in Ingolstadt)

There are also two integrated institutes of Higher Education for:
 Religious Education and Church Educational Work
 Social Work

There are also:
 an Institute for Marriage and the Family in society
 an Institute for Latin American Studies
 an Institute for Central and Eastern European Studies
 a Centre for Interdisciplinary Health Sciencesl
 a language teaching centre

Library

In February 2007 it was revealed that the university library had recycled 80 tons of books and journals, of which 68.4 tons had been donated from the central library in Altötting of the Bavarian Capuchin monasteries. This is about one quarter of the 300,000 volumes of philosophy and theology donated for the purpose of being included in university library's collections. An inquest ordered by the Government of the Free State of Bavaria concluded that no valuable books had been destroyed.

References

 University's English language booklet

External links

  
 Apostolic Constitution of the Supreme Pontiff John Paul II on Catholic Universities
 Portal of the Political Science Students' Association at the CU (Fachschaft Politik)  *
 Francis of Assisi Academy for the Protection of Earth, Eichstätt

Catholic University of Eichstätt-Ingolstadt
Ingolstadt
Educational institutions established in 1980
Eichstätt
1980 establishments in West Germany
Universities and colleges in Bavaria